Nowe may refer to the following places:
Nowe in Kuyavian-Pomeranian Voivodeship (north-central Poland)
Nowe, Łódź Voivodeship (central Poland)
Nowe, Świętokrzyskie Voivodeship (south-central Poland)
Nowe, Greater Poland Voivodeship (west-central Poland)